The Southern Tagalog Arterial Road (STAR), commonly known as the STAR Tollway, is a two-to-four-lane  controlled-access toll expressway in the province of Batangas in the Philippines. It is operated by STAR Infrastructure Development Corporation (STAR – IDC). The expressway is signed as E2 of the Philippine expressway network, alongside the South Luzon Expressway and unspecified portions of the Skyway. The expressway starts at the interchange with the Pan-Philippine Highway and the South Luzon Expressway in Santo Tomas and runs southward, near Diversion Road, to Batangas City. It passes through the cities and municipalities of Tanauan, Malvar, Lipa, San Jose, and Ibaan.

The expressway was opened on 2001, with its first segment built between Santo Tomas and Lipa. In 2008, it was extended toward Batangas City, and in June 2010, the South Luzon Expressway was connected to the STAR Tollway, further shortening travel time between Manila and Batangas.

With increasing traffic demand in the Batangas City – Bauan area and the Batangas Bay area, proposals to extend the expressway are laid out to decongest the existing routes through those areas. Two projects are proposed to extend the expressway to barangay Pinamucan, within Batangas City, and to the municipality of Bauan. The STAR Tollway is treated as a separate expressway despite being connected with SLEX since June 2010.

Route description

The STAR Tollway parallels most of the route of the President Jose P. Laurel Highway, which spurs off from the Maharlika Highway at Santo Tomas towards Lipa and Batangas City, and the Ibaan-Batangas City segment of the Batangas-Quezon Road. The road mostly traverses rural barangays of the cities and municipalities it passes and also overlooks several mountains.

The STAR Tollway starts as the physical extension of South Luzon Expressway past the overpass with the abandoned Philippine National Railways (PNR) branch line to Batangas City and an access road for Light Industry and Science Park III at Santo Tomas. Until June 2010, the toll road ended at Santo Tomas Exit. Spanning , the road widens for a short distance as it crosses the San Juan River and enters Tanauan, where the Sto. Tomas toll plaza is located, before narrowing back to two lanes. The road meets with Tanauan Exit, which serves the city proper of Tanauan. Past Tanauan Exit, STAR Tollway descends on a scenic curve before ascending on approach to Malvar. Entering Malvar, the road mostly passes rural areas, mostly containing large coconut plantations and small residential areas. Also, within Malvar, Mount Maculot can be seen on the west of the road and Mount Malarayat can be sighted on the east. Afterwards, it enters Lipa, and the road gradually curving before approaching Lipa Exit, which provides access to the city proper and to the nearby towns of Mataasnakahoy, Cuenca, and Alitagtag. The exit once served as the tollway's southern terminus until 2007, when STAR Tollway was extended southward towards Batangas City.

 
Past Lipa Exit, STAR Tollway is mostly dual carriageway, until it narrows in approach to Batangas City. Spanning , this segment was a two-lane expressway from its opening in 2008, until the second roadway opened on 2014. The roadways of this segment is concrete, with the southbound roadway the former two-lane expressway, that has been in bad condition with increased traffic demand. The road mostly runs through the rural barangays of Lipa. Then, it curves slightly on approach to San Jose and enters Ibaan. At Ibaan Exit, the road intersects San Jose-Ibaan Road at a diamond interchange where the expressway passes above grade. Past Ibaan Exit, STAR Tollway mostly runs an arcing route, traversing several rural barangays of Ibaan and paralleling the Batangas-Quezon Road from Ibaan to Batangas City. The road narrows back to two lanes at Sabang Bridge on the Ibaan-Batangas City boundary. The approach to Batangas City from Ibaan was a site of a fatal head-on collision between a jeep and a bus, that killed 7 in January 2011. The road becomes a 3-lane road, with a concrete Jersey barrier dividing the road, ascending in a cutting before following a straight course on rolling terrain up to the STAR Tollway's southern terminus at Balagtas Rotunda. The road widens at the Batangas toll plaza (also known as Balagtas toll plaza), narrows back to 3 lanes, and ends at the Balagtas Rotunda, a roundabout with Jose P. Laurel Highway and Batangas Port Diversion Road.

History

In an effort to link the different Southern Tagalog provinces to the National Capital Region, the government with the cooperation of the Provincial Government of Batangas and with the technical and country developmental assistance of the Government of Japan through the Japan Official Development Assistance, started the development of the STAR Tollway.

The STAR Tollway I, from Santo Tomas to Lipa, was opened in 2001; STAR Tollway II, from Lipa to Batangas City, opened in 2008. It was opened as part of the Road Development Project of the government, linking the South Luzon Expressway to STAR Tollway onwards to the Batangas Port in Batangas City. The travel time from Manila to Batangas City was reduced to 2 hours when STAR Tollway II opened. The STAR Tollway Project I and II were funded by Japan Bank for International Cooperation (JBIC) and Japan International Cooperation Agency (JICA) and implemented by the Department of Public Works and Highways – Urban Roads Project Office (DPWH – URPO).

The STAR Tollway is now under the supervision of the Toll Regulatory Board (TRB) and is being maintained by Star Tollway Corporation, a subsidiary of San Miguel Corporation.

Renaming 
On February 9, 2004, Batangas's 3rd District Congresswoman Victoria Hernandez-Reyes authored House Bill 2753, or also known as the "Act of Renaming the Southern Tagalog Arterial Road (STAR) to Apolinario Mabini Superhighway (AMS)." On May 15, 2007, President Gloria Macapagal Arroyo signed and approved House Bill 2753 to rename the Southern Tagalog Arterial Road to Apolinario Mabini Superhighway, after the Filipino revolutionary and Batangas native Apolinario Mabini, and it was made into a law called the Republic Act 9462 (RA 9462).

Redevelopment

Announced by the concessionaire, STAR-Infrastructure Development Corporation (SIDC), on May 16, 2013, the STAR Tollway Upgrading and Rehabilitation Project began in July 2013 as announced by SIDC president Melvin Nazareno. Under the project, the expressway undergone several upgrade and rehabilitation on its roads and facilities in order to cope with the traffic demand of the expressway. The expressway redevelopment included asphalting the Santo Tomas – Lipa segment, upgrading the Lipa – Batangas City segment to a four-lane divided expressway, improvements on the toll collection system, installation of closed circuit television (CCTV) cameras for traffic monitoring, and addition of lighting on some segments. The expansion of the Lipa–Batangas City segment commenced in June 2013, and finished in June 2015 with adding of lights.

Sabang Bridge, which connects the town of Ibaan and Batangas City, was closed to all traffic in December 2016 to repair damage of Typhoon Nina (Nock-ten), leaving Ibaan Exit to be the temporary south end of the expressway. On August 15, 2017, a partial re-opening of Sabang Bridge was conducted for Class 1 vehicles and on August 20, 2017, it was re-opened to all vehicle classes resuming full operations to and from the Batangas Exit.

Future

Pinamucan Bypass

A  extension of STAR Tollway, is proposed by the Sangguniang Panlalawigan of Batangas as two priority projects that will benefit the province as well as Mimaropa. The proposed extension will increase economic growth in the Batangas Bay area and reduce congestion on existing roads in Batangas City. The project will cost , and will pass through the barangays of Tinga Itaas, Tinga Labac, San Pedro, Dumantay, Sampaga, Sirang Lupa, and San Isidro, all in Batangas City. The project, dubbed the Pinamucan Bypass Road is expected to be completed before 2021. Right of way acquisition and construction work began on August 21, 2018, with funding from the Batangas 2nd District engineering office.

Bauan extension

Another extension to Bauan, called the Batangas City–San Pascual–Bauan Road is proposed by the Department of Public Works and Highways as an alternative to the existing national road between Batangas City and Bauan. The project is expected to decongest the existing national road, whose traffic demand reached beyond capacity due to roadside establishments, industrial areas, and the Batangas Port, and increase economic development in the Batangas City–Bauan area. The proposed alignment of the toll road will start at the present terminus of STAR Tollway at barangay Balagtas, pass through the northern rural barangays of Batangas City and San Pascual, and end at the national road to Mabini at barangay Manghinao in Bauan. The proposed toll road is being constructed as an at-grade bypass only, connecting with Diversion Road, with right of way acquisition and construction works started on February 21, 2018.

Toll

The whole expressway employs a closed system, where motorists are charged based on the kilometers travelled from the entry to exit point vehicle class. Toll collection is done upon exit at STAR Tollway, SLEX, or MCX or at Skyway's Main toll plaza.

The expressway fully implements an electronic toll collection (ETC) system, the Autosweep RFID, using RFID technology. Such ETC system is shared with Skyway, SLEX, NAIAX, TPLEX, and MCX.

Services
The Southern Tagalog Arterial Road currently has three service areas, all of which are Petron stations, with two on the northbound and one on the southbound. The service areas also provide ETC reloading for Autosweep RFID users.

Exits

STAR Tollway-Pinamucan Bypass

Batangas City–San Pascual–Bauan Road

See also
Transportation in the Philippines
Department of Public Works and Highways
Philippine National Construction Corporation

Notes

References

External links 

Contractor website

Toll roads in the Philippines
Roads in Batangas